Saillat-sur-Vienne (literally Saillat on Vienne;) is a commune in the Haute-Vienne department in the Nouvelle-Aquitaine region in west-central France. Because of the town's name's native pronunciation, Saillat was formerly known as Chaillac.

Inhabitants are known as Saillatais.

See also
Communes of the Haute-Vienne department

References

Communes of Haute-Vienne